The Charlotte mayoral election of 2005 was held on 8 November 2005 to elect a Mayor of Charlotte, North Carolina.  It was won by Republican incumbent Pat McCrory, who won a sixth consecutive term by defeating Democratic nominee Craig Madans in the general election.

Primaries

Republican primary

Democratic primary
Craig Madans won the Democratic nomination unopposed.

General election

Footnotes

2005
Charlotte
2005 North Carolina elections